Sanguinetti is an Italian surname. Notable people with the surname include:

Alessandra Sanguinetti (born 1968), American photographer
Carlos Sanguinetti (born 1961), Argentine sailor
Carmen Sanguinetti (born 1977), Uruguayan politician
Davide Sanguinetti (born 1972), Italian professional tennis player
Evelyn Sanguinetti (born 1970), American politician
Frank Sanguinetti (1886–1973), Australian rules footballer
Frederick Sanguinetti (1847–1906), British colonial administrator
Gianfranco Sanguinetti (born 1948), Italian writer
Giorgio Sanguinetti, Italian musicologist
Guillermo Sanguinetti (born 1966), Uruguayan footballer
Javier Sanguinetti (born 1971), Argentinian footballer
Jorge Sanguinetti (born 1934), Uruguayan politician
Julio María Sanguinetti (born 1936), Uruguayan politician, 57th and 59th President of Uruguay
Leopoldo Sanguinetti, Gibraltarian poet and writer
Mateo Sanguinetti (born 1992), Uruguayan rugby union player
Natalina Sanguinetti (born 1940), Italian fencer
Raúl Sanguinetti (1933–2000), Argentinian chess grandmaster
Robert Sanguinetti (born 1988), American ice hockey defenceman

See also
Palazzo Vizzani Lambertini Sanguinetti
Sanguineti, an Italian surname

Italian-language surnames